Gunilla Katarina Backman (born 18 June 1965) is a Swedish singer, actress, and musical-artist.

Early life and career
Backman comes from a musical family and studied classical ballet from 1972 until 1982 at Kungliga Teaterns balettskola and at the Balettakademien, Statens Dansskola and Cullbergbaletten. She attended Adolf Fredrik's Music School and studied song at the age of seventeen, when she debuted in the role of Liesl in the musical Sound of Music at Folkan. At the same theater she also acted in the children's play Snövit och de sju dvärgarna about Snow white.  In both productions she got to know her co-star Peter Jöback whom she after that has co-operated with several times. After these works she has worked primarily within song and musicals.

Career
In 1984, she toured with Carola Häggkvist, and along with singer Henriette Johnsson she started the pop duo Katz. The group toured Europe and she also recorded solo singles in Italy in 1989. In 1990, she got the role of Cosette in the musical Les Misérables at Cirkus in Stockholm, she was part of the ensemble for over 1000 plays of the musical both in Sweden, Germany and London. In 1992, she had the lead role of Maria in West Side Story at Riksteatern, and after that she acted in a revue with Bosse Parnevik, Monica Zetterlund and others.

In 1994, she acted in Ingmar Bergman's special production of Shakespeare's En Vintersaga at Dramaten and she also acted in the musical  Elvira Madigan at Riksteatern. In 1996 she started several years of intensive international work with Andrew Lloyd-Webber musical Sunset Boulevard in the German city of Niedernhausen, Les Misérables in Germany and London, Miss Saigon in London, a concert tour in South Africa and Chess in Denmark.

In 2002, she returned to Stockholm and Oscarsteatern to act as the title role of Greta Garbo in Garbo The Musical, followed by her big breakthrough role as Donna, in the Swedish version of the musical Mamma Mia! at Cirkus between 2005 and 2007.  She won the award Guldmasken for this role. In 2009, she participated in the show PrimaDONNOR at Hamburger Börs along with Charlott Strandberg and Sussie Eriksson. Between 2010 and 2011 she played the lead role as Norma Desmond in Göteborgsoperans musical Sunset Boulevard.

In 2012, she played Maria Magdalena in the musical Jesus Christ Superstar along with Ola Salo at Göta Lejon in Stockholm. In 2013, she played Desiree Armfledt in Stephen Sondeheim's Sommarnattens leende at Malmö Opera. Backman has from time to time been part of Rhapsody in Rock, also in the Ted Gärdestad celebration tour Sol, vind & Vatten in 2008. In 2013, she participated in the television recorded arena tour I Love Musicals along with Peter Jöback. She has made several concerts with Malmö Brandkårs Musikkår along with Jan Malmsjö.

Backman has participated in a number of television shows like Allsång på Skansen broadcast on SVT, Allsång på Liseberg with Lotta Engberg on TV4, TV-huset, Så ska det låta, Sing along, Doobidoo, Nationaldagen and Nyårsfirande from Skansen. She also had a part in the so-called Melodifestivalmusikalen which was the break show at Melodifestivalen 2007.

Discography 
2005 – Mamma Mia! 
2006 – Nära mig
2006 – Julens ljus
2006 – Julskivan 2006
2010 – Gunilla Backman sings Andrew Lloyd-Webber

Filmography
Babar och hans vänner (voice)
Tummelisa (voice)

References

Living people
1965 births
Balettakademien
20th-century Swedish women singers
21st-century Swedish women singers